Barbara Alred (31 October 1953 – December 1995) was a British gymnast. She competed at the 1972 Summer Olympics.

References

External links
 

1953 births
1995 deaths
British female artistic gymnasts
Olympic gymnasts of Great Britain
Gymnasts at the 1972 Summer Olympics
Sportspeople from Bradford
20th-century British women